The China Zhi Gong Party is one of the eight legally recognized minor political parties in the People's Republic of China that are subservient to the Chinese Communist Party (CCP) and represented in the Chinese People's Political Consultative Conference (CPPCC), a principal organization in the CCP's united front strategy. Some scholars have described the Zhi Gong Party as "gathering non-party voices to support the party".

History 

The China Zhi Gong Party derives from the overseas Hung Society organization "Hung Society Zhigong Hall" or "Chee Kung Tong", based in San Francisco, United States. This organization was one of the key supporters of Sun Yat-sen in his revolutionary efforts to overthrow the Qing dynasty.

The party was founded in October 1925 in San Francisco, and was led by Chen Jiongming and Tang Jiyao, two ex-Kuomintang warlords that went into opposition. Their first platform was federalism and multi-party democracy. The party moved its headquarters to the then-British colony of Hong Kong in 1926. After the Japanese invasion of Manchuria in 1931 it began engaging in anti-Japanese propaganda and boycotts. The party was nearly wiped out during the Japanese occupation of Hong Kong. The party turned to the left during its third party congress in 1947.

After the People's Republic of China was founded, at the invitation of the CCP, representatives of the CZGP attended the First Plenary Session of the CPPCC in 1949. They participated in drawing up the CPPCC Common Program and electing the Central People's Government. As part of the CCP's reorganization of the minor aligned parties, the CZGP was designated as the party of returned overseas Chinese, their relatives, and noted figures and scholars who have overseas ties.

On occasions, the Zhi Gong Party appears to be used as an intermediary for contacts with certain foreign interests. For example, when a delegation of Paraguayan politicians visited Beijing in 2001 and met Li Peng (despite Paraguay having diplomatic relations not with PRC but with ROC in Taiwan), it was invited not by the PRC government or the CCP, but by the Zhi Gong Party.

In April 2007, Wan Gang, Deputy Chair of the Zhi Gong Party Central Committee, was appointed Technology Minister of China. This was the first non-CCP ministerial appointment in China in 35 years.

Leaders 
 Chen Jiongming (1925–1933)
  (1933–1947)
 Li Jishen (1947–1950)
  (1950–1970, died in office)
  (1979–1984)
 Dong Yinchu (1984–1997)
 Luo Haocai (1997–2007)
 Wan Gang (2007–2022)
 Jiang Zuojun (2022–)

See also 
 For Public Good Party
 Tiandihui
 Guangfuhui

References

External links 

 

 
1925 establishments in China
Political parties established in 1925